Adoxophyes olethra is a species of moth of the family Tortricidae first described by Józef Razowski in 2013. It is found on Seram Island in Indonesia. The habitat consists of upper montane forests.

The wingspan is about 14 mm. The forewings are yellow with brown suffusions and markings. The hindwings are cream.

Etymology
The species name refers to the position within the genus and is derived from Greek olethros (meaning something lost).

References

Moths described in 2013
Adoxophyes
Moths of Indonesia